Jowpish (also Romanized as Jowpīsh; also known as Jopīsh) is a village in Lafmejan Rural District, in the Central District of Lahijan County, Gilan Province, Iran. At the 2006 census, its population was 184, in 61 families.

References 

Populated places in Lahijan County